Thung Yai is the westernmost district (amphoe) of Nakhon Si Thammarat province, southern Thailand.

History
Tambon Ku Rae was separated from Thung Song district and made the minor district (king amphoe) Ku Rae in 1906. When the office was moved to Tambon Tha Yang in 1909, the minor district was renamed following the central tambon name. However, when the government was about to upgrade the minor district, the name Tha Yang was already given to a district of Phetchaburi province. Thus when the minor district was upgraded to a full district on 1 April 1961, it was named Thung Yai after one of the tambon of the district.

Geography
Neighboring districts are (from the north clockwise): Tham Phannara, Chawang, Na Bon, Thung Song, Bang Khan of Nakhon Si Thammarat; Lam Thap, Khao Phanom of Krabi province; and Phrasaeng of Surat Thani province.

The important water resource is the Tapi River.

Administration
The district is divided into seven sub-districts (tambons), which are further subdivided into 63 villages (mubans). Tha Yang is a township (thesaban tambon) covering parts of the tambon Tha Yang. There are a further seven tambon administrative organizations (TAO).

References

External links
amphoe.com

Districts of Nakhon Si Thammarat province